G-ASWI was a Westland Wessex 60, operated by Bristow Helicopters operating between Bacton Gas Terminal, in Norfolk, and Amoco gas platforms in the North Sea. On 13 August 1981 the helicopter lost power to the main rotor gearbox, going out of control during the ensuing autorotation. The flight was carrying 11 gas workers from the Leman gas field to Bacton. All people on board were lost.

Aircraft

G-ASWI had previously been the Westland Helicopters Company demonstrator before being purchased by Bristow Helicopters Ltd. in April 1970.

Accident and outcomes

G-ASWI left the North Denes airfield at 13:47 on Thursday 13 August 1981 on a routine passenger and freight flight between rigs on the Leman and Indefatigable gas fields. The crew consisted of a pilot and a cabin attendant.

At 15:41, returning from the Leman field to the landing site at Bacton, the commander, Ben Breach, sent a distress message reporting that he was ditching due to engine failure. Radar lost the aircraft three seconds later. A Royal Air Force Search and Rescue Westland Sea King left RAF Coltishall at 15:47, sighting floating wreckage from G-ASWI at 15:57. There were no survivors.

Efforts to recover the wreck were delayed, meaning that the wreck was beyond recovery by the time salvage operations started. There was insufficient evidence to explain either the loss of power or loss of control that caused the aircraft to crash. The inquest into the deaths of those on board recorded an open verdict.

Memorial
On 13 August 2014, a memorial to those killed in the crash was unveiled at Great Yarmouth Minster. A major article on the ongoing effects of the crash was published in the Eastern Daily Press in September 2014.

See also
 1982 Bristow Helicopters Bell 212 crash

References
 Report No: 4/1983. Report on the accident to Westland Wessex 60, G-ASWI, 12 miles ENE of Bacton, Norfolk on 13 August 1981 
 4/1983 Westland Wessex 60, G-ASWI Appendices

Aviation accidents and incidents in England
Aviation accidents and incidents in 1981
1981 in England
Airliner accidents and incidents with an unknown cause
Aviation accidents and incidents in the North Sea
Accidents and incidents involving helicopters
Bristow Helicopters accidents and incidents
August 1981 events in the United Kingdom